This is the qualifying process for the 2022 Rugby World Cup Sevens with the aim of selecting the men's national rugby sevens teams that will compete in the tournament in Cape Town, South Africa. A total of 59 nations took part in the qualifying process.

General 
The tournament is organized by World Rugby to be held from the 9th to the 11th of September 2022, twenty-four teams in total will be competing. South Africa automatically qualified as hosts as well as the eight quarterfinalists of the 2018 Rugby World Cup Sevens. The other 16 teams qualified through their respective regional tournaments.

Qualified teams

Qualifying

Africa 

14 teams competed in the Rugby Africa's Sevens tournament on 23–24 April 2022 in Kampala, Uganda contesting for the three qualifying spots. Uganda, Zimbabwe, and Kenya qualified for the World Cup.

North America 

13 teams competed in the RAN Sevens Qualifiers on 23–24 April 2022 in Nassau, Bahamas contesting for the two qualifying spots, Canada and Jamaica were the two teams to qualify.

South America 

Nine teams competed in the Sudamérica Sevens tournament on 27–28 November 2021 in San José, Costa Rica, Uruguay and Chile were the two teams to book their World Cup spots.

Asia 

Eight teams competed for the two qualifying spots on 19–20 November 2021 in Dubai with Hong Kong and South Korea going through.

Europe 

Twelve teams competed in the European Qualifiers for the four available spots on 16–17 July 2022 in Bucharest, Romania. Ireland, Germany, Portugal, and Wales were the teams to qualify; Germany qualified for their first Sevens World Cup.

Oceania 

Oceania was unable to hold any qualifying tournament due to the ongoing impacts of COVID-19 in 2021 and 2022. Fiji and New Zealand had qualified automatically as quarterfinalists from the 2018 Sevens World Cup. Australia and Samoa qualified due to finishing 4th and 12th, respectively, in the 2019–20 World Rugby Sevens Series. Tonga was given the final spot by placing 5th in the 2019 Oceania Sevens.

References

External links 

 Official Website

Rugby World Cup Sevens qualification
Qualifying
World Cup Qualifier Sevens
World Cup Qualifier Sevens